The National Council of Paper and Pulp Workers' Unions (Domei Kamipa Kyogikai) was a trade union representing workers in the paper making industry in Japan.

The union was established in 1973 and affiliated to the Japanese Confederation of Labour.  In 1973, it had 9,926 members.  In 1988, it merged with the National Federation of Paper and Pulp Industry Workers' Unions, the General Federation of Paper and Pulp Processing Workers' Unions, and the Paper and Pulp Industry Workers Unions Consultative Council, to form the Japanese Federation of Pulp and Paper Workers' Unions.

References

Paper industry trade unions
Trade unions established in 1973
Trade unions disestablished in 1988
Trade unions in Japan